Torre del Compte or La Torre del Comte is a municipality located in the Matarraña/Matarranya, province of Teruel, Aragon, Spain. According to the 2004 census (INE), the municipality has a population of 169 inhabitants.

References

Municipalities in the Province of Teruel
Matarraña/Matarranya